The Sarawak Regatta is an annual paddling event held on the Sarawak River in Kuching, Malaysia.

History 
The Regatta traces its origins to the era of James Brooke who instituted the use of boat races to settle conflict between tribes in Sarawak.

Events

Current events 
The following events were offered at the 2010 regatta:

Balok Boat
7 paddlers (men)
Bidar Boat
Bidar 15 Paddlers Mixed (8 Men + 7 Women)
Bidar 20 Paddlers Men (Government Agency & Corporate)
Bidar 10 Paddlers Women
Bidar 15 Paddlers Men
Bidar 20 Paddlers - Inter Division
Bidar 30 Paddlers - Hotel/Travel Agency (Open) (25 Men + 5 Women) - Malaysia Tourism Promotion Board Challenge Trophy
Bidar 20 Paddlers Men - TELEKOM Malaysia Challenge Trophy
Bidar 30 Paddlers Men - VIP (Group A)-Cahya Mata Sarawak Challenge Trophy
Bidar 30 Paddlers Men - VIP (Group B)-Resident Office of Kuching Challenge Trophy
Bidar 30 Paddlers Men - TYT (Tuan Yang Terutama Negeri Sarawak) Challenge Trophy
Kenyalang Boat
15 Paddlers - Tourists
20 Paddlers - International (Open)
20 Paddlers Men (Inter IPTA/IPTS/IP)
Tambang Boat
Motorised
Non-Motorised

References

External links 
 Official Website

Paddling
Sport in Sarawak
Kuching
Events in Sarawak